Blanca Pacheco is an American attorney and politician serving as a member of the California State Assembly for the 64th district, which includes Downey, Norwalk, Whittier, and La Mirada. She assumed office on December 5, 2022.

Early life and education 
After graduating from Downey High School, Pacheco earned a Bachelor of Arts degree in political science from the University of California, Los Angeles and a Juris Doctor from the Loyola Law School.

Career 
From 2006 to 2014, Pacheco worked as an attorney and real estate broker at Realty Executives in Pico Rivera, California. From 2006 to 2018, she operated an independent legal practice, specializing in probate, estates, and evictions. Pacheco joined Olivarez Madruga Lemieux O’Neill, LLP, in El Monte in 2020. She also served as a member of the Downey City Council and as Mayor of Downey. Pacheco was elected to the California State Assembly in November 2022.

References 

Living people
California Democrats
Members of the California State Assembly
Women state legislators in California
Hispanic and Latino American women in politics
Hispanic and Latino American state legislators in California
People from Downey, California
University of California, Los Angeles alumni
Loyola Law School alumni
California lawyers
Loyola Marymount University alumni
People from Los Angeles County, California
Year of birth missing (living people)